The Army Public School, Kunraghat, Gorakhpur is a school located in the Kunraghat area, in Gorakhpur, India. It is operated under Indian Army supervision under the aegis of Indian Army welfare Education society . The school was founded in 1954 by Neena Thapa, wife of Colonel Gopal Kushal Singh Thapa, then Commandant GRD, Kunraghat. On 1 April 1994 it was re-designated as "Army School, Kunraghat" after dissolution of the existing Gorkha Recruiting Depot (GRD) High School and absorption of its students. The premises and assets of GRD High School in situ were transferred to Army School, Kunraghat. 

Most of the students in this school are from Army Background.

References

Education in Gorakhpur
Indian Army Public Schools